Vera June Miles (née Ralston; born August 23, 1929) is an American retired actress who worked closely with Alfred Hitchcock, most notably as Lila Crane in the classic 1960 film Psycho, reprising the role in the 1983 sequel Psycho II. Other films in which she appeared include Tarzan's Hidden Jungle (1955), The Searchers (1956), Alfred Hitchcock's The Wrong Man (1956), A Touch of Larceny (1959), The Man Who Shot Liberty Valance (1962), Follow Me, Boys! (1966), Hellfighters (1968), Sergeant Ryker (1968), and Molly and Lawless John (1972).

Early life
Vera June Ralston was born in Boise City, Oklahoma, on August 23, 1929, to Thomas and Bernice (née Wyrick) Ralston. She had two older brothers. 

She grew up first in Pratt, Kansas, and later lived in Wichita, where she worked nights as a Western Union operator-typist and graduated from Wichita North High School in 1947. She was crowned Miss Kansas in 1948 and was the third runner-up in the Miss America contest.

Career
Miles moved to Los Angeles in 1949 and landed small roles in television and film, including a minor role as a chorus girl in Two Tickets to Broadway (1951), a musical starring Janet Leigh, with whom Miles co-starred nine years later in the classic Alfred Hitchcock film Psycho. She used her first husband's name, Miles, because there already was a Vera Ralston film actress. Miles eventually was put under contract at various studios. She once recalled, "I was dropped by the best studios in town."

Miles's first credited film appearance was in The Rose Bowl Story (1952), a romantic comedy in which she played a Tournament of Roses queen.

While under contract to Warner Bros., Miles was cast alongside her future husband Gordon Scott in the 1955 film Tarzan's Hidden Jungle as Tarzan's love interest. The following year, she was cast by director John Ford as Jeffrey Hunter's love interest in the John Wayne Western The Searchers (1956), and appeared in the movies Wichita, directed by Jacques Tourneur and 23 Paces to Baker Street with Van Johnson. Also in 1956, Miles starred as Rose Balestrero, the fragile wife of Manny Balestrero, a musician falsely accused of a crime and played by Henry Fonda, in the film The Wrong Man. The movie was directed by Alfred Hitchcock, and is one of only a few Hitchcock films based on real-life events.

Signing a five-year personal contract with Hitchcock in 1957, Miles was widely publicized as the director's potential successor to Grace Kelly. Two years prior, Hitchcock had directed Miles in the role of Ralph Meeker's emotionally troubled new bride in "Revenge", the pilot episode of his television series Alfred Hitchcock Presents.

Vertigo (1958), a project Hitchcock designed as a showcase for his new star, was met with production delays. Miles's subsequent pregnancy would cost her the lead role which eventually went to Kim Novak with whom Hitchcock reportedly clashed, although Ms. Novak has stated in interviews that she did not have trouble working with Hitchcock on the film. Vertigo (which also starred James Stewart) was not a financial or critical success at the time, with Hitchcock claiming that Novak was miscast. Despite Hitchcock's disappointment regarding Vertigo, he continued to work with Miles, eventually casting her in what is arguably the role for which she is most remembered, that of Lila Crane in Psycho. In the film, she portrayed the determined sister of the doomed motel guest Marion Crane (Janet Leigh), who teams up with Marion's boyfriend and a private investigator to find her. Miles later appeared in two episodes of The Alfred Hitchcock Hour (in 1962 and 1965).

In 1962, Miles reunited with director John Ford for the film The Man Who Shot Liberty Valance. Starring alongside her former co-star from The Searchers, John Wayne, she is pursued by both Wayne and James Stewart, two very different men competing for her hand in marriage.

In addition to her film appearances, Miles was featured in many popular television shows throughout her career, including Gunsmoke, Wagon Train, Laramie, The Twilight Zone, and the western series Riverboat, starring Darren McGavin and Burt Reynolds. She also co-starred in the first episode of ABC's The Fugitive (titled "Fear in a Desert City") and guest-starred in episodes of The Outer Limits, Burke's Law, The Eleventh Hour, The Man from U.N.C.L.E., and Ironside.

In 1965, Miles had a supporting role in three episodes of the CBS series My Three Sons. The same year, she co-starred with lead actors Robert Culp and Bill Cosby in the pilot episode of the TV series I Spy entitled "Affair in T'Sien Cha" (although the pilot was not actually broadcast until midway through the series’ first season).

Other notable films in which Miles appeared included the Walt Disney film Follow Me, Boys! (1966) with Fred MacMurray, and Hellfighters (1968), reuniting again with John Wayne. Miles had also filmed scenes with Wayne for the movie The Green Berets (also 1968), playing Wayne's character's wife. However, with Warner Bros. wanting more action in the film, her scenes were cut.

Miles continued to appear in numerous TV films and TV series during the 1970s, including the pilot for the TV series Cannon (broadcast in March 1971) as the wife of a deceased war comrade of private investigator Frank Cannon, played by William Conrad. She guest-starred in a further two episodes of the series in different roles during its run. In 1973, she appeared alongside Peter Falk in "Lovely But Lethal", an episode of NBC's Columbo, playing a cosmetics queen who commits murder. She also made guest appearances in episodes of Hawaii Five-O, The Streets of San Francisco, and Fantasy Island.

In 1983, more than 20 years after Psycho, Miles reprised the role of Lila Crane in Psycho II, joining Anthony Perkins in the sequel. Miles and Perkins were the only stars of the original film to appear in this second installment. Miles continued to appear in a number of TV and film productions during the 1980s, with appearances in the movies The Initiation (1984) and Into the Night (1985), and guest-starring in episodes of the TV series The Love Boat (1982 and 1984) and Hotel (1984 and 1987). She also appeared alongside Angela Lansbury in the TV series Murder, She Wrote, guest-starring in three episodes broadcast in 1985, 1990, and 1991. The 1991 episode, titled "Thursday's Child", was her final television role. Miles acted just once more, appearing alongside James Belushi in the film Separate Lives (1995), before retiring from the industry.

Personal life
Miles has been married four times. Her first husband was Bob Miles. They were married from 1948 to 1954, and had two daughters, Debra and Kelley. Her second husband was Gordon Scott, her co-star in Tarzan's Hidden Jungle. They were married from 1956 to 1960 and had one son, Michael. Her third husband was actor Keith Larsen (né Keith Larsen Burt). They were married from 1960 to 1971 and had one son, Erik.

Miles's first three former husbands died within a short time of each other. Her third husband, Keith Larsen, died on December 13, 2006; first husband, stuntman and small-part actor Bob Miles died on April 12, 2007; and second husband, retired actor and bodybuilder Gordon Scott, died 18 days later on April 30, 2007. Miles was married to her fourth husband, director Robert Jones, from 1973 until their divorce in 1975.

One of her grandsons, actor Jordan Essoe, met with actress Jessica Biel in 2012 in preparation for Biel's portrayal of Miles in the film Hitchcock.

Miles is a member of the Church of Jesus Christ of Latter-day Saints. She also had been a frequent visitor to Salt Lake City, Utah, was greatly involved in the Boy Scouts of America, and is a member of the Hollywood California Stake.

A Republican, Miles supported the re-election of Dwight Eisenhower during the 1956 presidential election.

In popular culture 
In the 2012 American biographical romantic drama film directed by Sacha Gervasi Hitchcock Vera Miles is played by Jessica Biel.

Filmography

Film

Television

References

External links

 

1929 births
Living people
20th-century American actresses
21st-century American women
Actors from Wichita, Kansas
Actresses from Kansas
Actresses from Oklahoma
American film actresses
American Latter Day Saints
American television actresses
California Republicans
Kansas Republicans
Miss America 1940s delegates
Miss America Preliminary Swimsuit winners
Oklahoma Republicans
People from Cimarron County, Oklahoma
People from Pratt, Kansas
Universal Pictures contract players
Warner Bros. contract players
Western (genre) film actresses